The Little Nevka or Malaya Nevka is the southern distributary of the Great Nevka. The Great Nevka splits into Little Nevka (the southern armlet) and Middle Nevka (the northern armlet) near the Kamenny Island's easternmost tip. It is also known for being the dumping ground of the famous Rasputin (of Russia) after his assassination. 

It has its own armlets: Krestovka, Karpovka and Zhdanovka. There are four bridges across Little Nevka: Kamennoostrovsky Bridge, Lazarevsky Bridge, Big Krestovsky Bridge, Bolshoy Petrovsky Bridge.

Rivers of Saint Petersburg
Distributaries of the Neva